The Oklahoma State University College of Arts and Sciences serves as the liberal arts and science components of Oklahoma State University in Stillwater, Oklahoma. The College of Arts and Sciences is the largest college at Oklahoma State University with over 24 departments and programs and a great diversity of students. The College of Arts and Sciences also encompasses the School of Visual and Performing Arts. The Dean is Glen Krutz. The College of Arts and Sciences includes both undergraduate and graduate studies in many different fields and pre-med and pre-law training. Bachelor degrees include: Bachelor of Arts (BA), Bachelor of Science (BS), Bachelor of Fine Arts (BFA), and Bachelor of Music (BM).

Departments

Aerospace Studies
Art
Art History
Biology 
Communication Sciences and Disorders
Chemistry
Computer Sciences
English
Foreign Languages
Geography
Geology
Graphic Design
History
Integrative Biology
Mathematics
Media and Strategic Communications
Microbiology and Molecular Genetics
Military Science
Music
Philosophy
Physics
Plant Biology, Ecology, and Evolution
Political Science
Psychology
Sociology
Statistics
Theatre

References

External links

College of Arts and Sciences
Liberal arts colleges at universities in the United States